Le Chénay-Gagny is a railway station in Gagny, Seine-Saint-Denis, France.

History 
The station is named after a former holder of the estate, Canus or Kanus, then Chenay, Chesnay and finally  Chénay. It has two exits: "Cité Jean Bouin" and "Poste du Chénay-Gagny". The district where the station is set now bears the same name.

Service 
The station is located at 16,115 kilometric point of the Paris-Est–Strasbourg-Ville railway. It has been served since 1999 by the RER E trains running on E2 branch, between Haussmann–Saint-Lazare and Chelles–Gournay. It is served in both directions by 4 to 8 trains an hour.

Traffic 
In 2005, more than 4,600 people entered the station every day.

Connections 
The station is served by
RATP Group bus line 214
TRA bus line 642
Les Autobus du Fort bus line 701
Noctilien night bus line N23

Notes and references

External links
 

Réseau Express Régional stations
Railway stations in Seine-Saint-Denis